In Philippine folklore, the Amomongo is a creature described as a hairy, man-sized ape with long nails. The name is probably derived from the Hiligaynon word amó, which translates "ape" or "monkey". Residents of La Castellana in Negros Occidental view the Amomongo as a violent, wild creature that lives in caves near the foot of the volcanic Mount Kanlaon. Amomongo is featured in a local folktale called "Amomongo and Iput-Iput," or "The Ape and the Firefly." The name Amomongo has also been translated to mean the word "gorilla," though this is not a native animal to the region.

On June 9, 2008, Amomongo supposedly attacked Elias Galvez and Salvador Aguilar of the La Castellana settlement and disemboweled numerous goats and chickens in the area for the purpose of eating the entrails. Attacks lasted until the next day on June 10. Medical records reveal that Galvez and Aguilar sustained numerous scratches on their faces, backs, and abdomens. Some compare the creature to other ape-like cryptids around the world, such as Bigfoot or Yeti, though the scientific community holds that it is just a legend mixed with mistaken identity. The native community holds that it is a wild animal, not an intelligent being like a witch or aswang.

References

Visayan mythology
Philippine legendary creatures
Culture of Negros Occidental
Hominid cryptids